SWAT Kats: The Radical Squadron is a side-scrolling action video game developed by AIM and published by Hudson Soft for the Super NES. It is based on the animated series of the same name, and was released in North America on August 21, 1995.

Gameplay 
The game is a 2-D action platformer with RPG elements in which the player controls either Razor or T-Bone. It features a password system and third-person flying sequences in the Turbokat Fighter. It is based on various episodes of the show and features a different boss for each world, with Dark Kat as the final boss. All worlds contain an urgent message from Mayor Manx (rather than Callie Briggs who has been kidnapped by Dark Kat) prior to the start of each world.

Reception 
Next Generation rated the game two stars out of five, stating that "What sets this apart are the intermittent fighter jet stages, done in someone's bizarre, myopic idea of what a simple 3D, one-point perspective should be – shots fired 'into' the screen, 'toward' your enemies tend to veer off to the 'sides.'  Someone not under the influence of mind-altering substances is going to take a while to 'hit' anything."

Reviews 
 GamePro (Sep, 1995)

References 

1995 video games
Action video games
Hudson Soft games
North America-exclusive video games
Platform games
Single-player video games
Super Nintendo Entertainment System games
Super Nintendo Entertainment System-only games
Video games about cats
Video games based on Hanna-Barbera series and characters
Video games developed in Japan
Warner Bros. video games